Across Indiana is a weekly 30-minute-long television program which covers places, people, history and culture across Indiana.

Hosted by Michael Atwood, Across Indiana is a regional Emmy winning program originating on WFYI TV 20 in Indianapolis.  The producer is Jim Simmons.  The executive producer is Clayton Taylor. It was originally produced and directed by Dave Stoelk, who is no longer with the program. Many of the most popular Across Indiana stories were shot by Chief Videographer Tim R. Swartz. It premiered in 1989. New episodes are no longer produced.

The theme music was written and recorded by Emmy-winning artist Tim Brickley.

In 1998 a book of recipes from the Hoosier state was released called Recipes From Across Indiana: The Best of Heartland Cooking edited by Sheila Sampson.

Broadcasting stations

 WFYI 20, Indianapolis, Indiana
 HCTV 22, Hanover, Indiana
 WNIN 9, Evansville, Indiana
 WTIU 30, Indiana University, Bloomington, Indiana
 WIPB 49, Ball State University, Muncie, Indiana
 WNIT 34, South Bend, Indiana
 WVUT 22, Vincennes University, Vincennes, Indiana

External links
 
 

1989 American television series debuts
Local television programming in the United States
2010 American television series endings